Paenalcaligenes hermetiae is a Gram-negative, facultatively anaerobic, short rod-shaped and non-motile bacterium from the genus Paenalcaligenes which has been isolated from the gut of the larva Hermetia illucens.

References

External links
Type strain of Paenalcaligenes hermetiae at BacDive -  the Bacterial Diversity Metadatabase

 

Burkholderiales
Bacteria described in 2013